Ilott is a surname. Notable people with the surname include: 

Callum Ilott (born 1998), British racing driver
Mark Ilott (born 1970), English cricketer
Nigel Ilott (born 1965), English cricketer
Percy Ilott (1916-2001), Australian footballer
Ray Ilott (1948-2016), Australian footballer